Venpa (Tamil: வெண்பா) is a 2019 Malaysian Tamil-language romantic comedy film. In the film, a girl falls for a boy, but the boy loves another girl from his past. Three of them meet in a one-hour conversation of love and conflict that changes their life.

It was released on September 19, 2019 in Malaysia, and received positive reviews.

The film is expanded from the 2017 short film Venpa (55 minutes) with the same director and cast. It is the first Malaysian Tamil-language film distributed by DMY Creation.

Synopsis 
Thenavan always rejects the women his mother has chosen for him. Sheila is a sweet girl who is often rejected by guys. She falls in love with Thenavan on their first meeting over his comforting behaviour. But Thenavan is still in love with Kalyani, a woman he has loved since his school days, but Kalyani seems to have no feelings for him. When Kalyani's handbag is stolen upon her arrival back to Malaysia, Thenavan helps her and asks her for an hour of conversation as a return favour. The conversation ends up as a turning point for Thenavan, Kalyani and Sheila, as well as Sathya, Kalyani's former lover. Back to the past,during her schooldays Kalyani is involved in a curriculum activities. So, one day when she was training her training lead by Thenavan who act as the leader. At first he seems to be very strict with a male when he didn't follow his instruction but later when Kalyani did the same mistake he spoke to her gently. Since then he develops a feeling towards Kalyani. One day he was sitting at a bench with his supper senior who is in upper 6, Satya. Satya's friends suddenly sang a song that connects him and Kalyani which makes Thenavan feels frustrated. Then when he told the truth to Satya, he get angry and scold and also warned Thenavan to stop thinking and try to expose his love to Kalyani. Then a few days later, Thenavan dan Satya become closer again. Thenavan also stops to think about Kalyani and focuses on his studies.When it is, Thenavan last day of SPM examination he planned to meet Kalyani and told to her about his love but suddenly Satya came and he offered a treat to Thenavan at a Mamak Shop near the school.

Cast
Yuvaraj Krishnasamy as Thenavan
Agalyah Maniam as Kalyani
Santeinii Chandrabos as Sheila
Thevaguru Suppiah as Sathya
Nanthini Sugumaran as Archana
Kuben Mahadevan as Jo Mama
Mugen Rao as Yuvaraj Balakrishnan (Cameo appearance)

Soundtrack
The soundtrack album and background scores are composed by Varmman Elangkovan. The album consists of 7 tracks, 5 of which are visualised in the film.

"Veyilukkum Kulir" is played in the teaser and it is also an short version of "Oru Murai".

"Thandayuthabaaniye 2.0" is played in end credits.

Box office 
The film ran for four weeks and grossed RM 401,102.30 ($96,154.89 in 2020) in its first two weeks. The film grossed RM 542,686.60 ($130,096.41 in USD) in its overall run and became the fifth highest grossing Malaysian Tamil film. The film was the highest grossing Malaysian Tamil film of 2019.

See also 
 List of Malaysian Tamil films

References

External links
 Venpa on Cinema.com.my
 Venpa on Popcorn Malaysia
 Venpa official facebook page

2019 films
Malaysian romantic comedy films
Tamil-language Malaysian films